Xiaoxian North railway station is a railway station of the Zhengzhou–Xuzhou High-Speed Railway in Xiao County, Anhui, China. The station will commence operation on 10 September 2016, together with the railway.

References

Railway stations in Anhui
Stations on the Xuzhou–Lanzhou High-Speed Railway
Railway stations in China opened in 2016
Suzhou, Anhui